Stuart Wilson (born 16 September 1977) is an English former football midfielder and former coach of Long Eaton Ladies FC.

External links

Since 1888... The Searchable Premiership and Football League Player Database (subscription required)
Sporting-heroes.net

1977 births
Living people
English footballers
Association football midfielders
Premier League players
Leicester City F.C. players
Sheffield United F.C. players
Cambridge United F.C. players
Cambridge City F.C. players
Anstey Nomads F.C. players
Shepshed Dynamo F.C. players
Grantham Town F.C. players
Nuneaton Borough F.C. players
Coalville Town F.C. players
Barrow Town F.C. players